Diaty N'Diaye (born 25 March 1984) is a Malian footballer. She has been a member of the Mali women's national team.

International career
N'Diaye capped for Mali at senior level during the 2006 African Women's Championship.

References

1984 births
Living people
Malian women's footballers
Mali women's international footballers
21st-century Malian people
Women's association footballers not categorized by position